Clepsis coriacana is a species of moth of the family Tortricidae. It is found on the Canary Islands.

The wingspan is 13–16 mm. The ground colour of the forewings is pale leathery yellow with weak traces of brownish markings. The hindwings are light grey.

References

Moths described in 1894
Clepsis